Benmalek is a surname. Notable people with the surname include: 

Anouar Benmalek (born 1956), Algerian novelist, journalist, mathematician, and poet
Boualem Benmalek (born 1989), Algerian footballer